Hemarthria is a genus of herbaceous plants in the grass family. They occur in the tropical and subtropical Old World, especially in China and Southeast Asia, with some species in Africa, Australia, and Southern Europe. They may be known generally as jointgrasses.

 Species
 Hemarthria altissima (Poir.) Stapf & C.E.Hubb. - limpograss, African jointgrass, Batavian quick grass, halt grass - China, India, Indochina, Borneo, Madagascar, Mauritius, Middle East, Caucasus, Africa, Canary Islands, Spain, Italy, Greece; naturalized in parts of North + South America
 Hemarthria compressa (L.f.) R.Br. - whip grass - China, Japan, Indian Subcontinent, Indochina, Borneo, Afghanistan, Iraq, Comoros
 Hemarthria debilis Bor - Thailand
 Hemarthria depressa Heuvel- Laos, Vietnam, Thailand, Malaysia
 Hemarthria hamiltoniana Steud. - India, Bangladesh
 Hemarthria longiflora (Hook.f.) A.Camus  - China, Indian Subcontinent, Indochina, Borneo
 Hemarthria natans Stapf - eastern + south-central Africa
 Hemarthria pratensis (Balansa) Clayton - Thailand, Vietnam, New Guinea
 Hemarthria protensa Steud. - Guangdong, eastern Himalayas, southeast Asia, New Guinea
 Hemarthria sibirica (Gand.) Ohwi - China, Japan, Korea, Pakistan, Russia (Amur Oblast, Primorye, Khabarovsk)
 Hemarthria stolonifera Bor - Thailand
 Hemarthria uncinata R.Br. - matgrass - Western Australia

 formerly included
see Coelorachis Mnesithea 
 Hemarthria perforata - Mnesithea laevis
 Hemarthria rugosa - Coelorachis rugosa

References

Andropogoneae
Poaceae genera
Grasses of Africa
Grasses of Asia
Grasses of Europe